Samarkand Airways was an airline based in Uzbekistan that performed passenger and cargo charter flights.  Established in 2005 out a joint American-Uzbekistani venture based out of Kentucky, the parent company, Universal Mobility Solutions, provided the aircraft for the fleet. The airline intended to establish a regular scheduled cargo route out of Tashkent to Dushanbe in 2008 using Ilyushin Il-76 and Antonov An-12 aircraft, but such route was not established. Passenger charters were carried out on Tupolev Tu-154, Yakolev Yak-40 and Avro RJ-85 aircraft, while chartered cargo flights used an Antonov An-26.

While the airline still technically exists, its website is gone and it is not in operation.

References

Airlines of Uzbekistan
Airlines established in 2005